Karl Wondrak was a Czech ski jumper. He competed in the individual event at the 1928 Winter Olympics.

References

Year of birth missing
Year of death missing
Czech male ski jumpers
Olympic ski jumpers of Czechoslovakia
Ski jumpers at the 1928 Winter Olympics
Place of birth missing